The 2018 Superclásico de las Américas – Copa Doctor Nicolás Leoz was the fifth edition of the Superclásico de las Américas. The match was played at the King Abdullah Sports City in Jeddah, Saudi Arabia. 

Brazil won the game 1–0 with an injury time headed goal by Miranda.

Venue

Match
Brazil won the match by the solitary goal scored by Miranda in the third minute of second half's added time.

Details 

|style="vertical-align:top; width:50%"|

|}

References

Superclásico de las Américas
Argentina national football team matches
Brazil national football team matches
Argentina–Brazil football rivalry
Superclásico de las Américas
International association football competitions hosted by Saudi Arabia
Superclásico de las Américas
Superclásico de las Américas